Nervures (English: Ribs) is a French aircraft manufacturer based in Soulom. The company specializes in the design and manufacture of paragliders and paramotor wings in the form of ready-to-fly aircraft, plus paragliding accessories.

Company paraglider designer Xavier Demoury has also designed gliders for ITV Parapentes and Aerodyne Technologies.

The company has been noted for its large range of gliders offered, especially two-place gliders. At several points in its history the company has offered more than one type of two-place glider, such as in 2003-04 when both the Nervures Stromboli and Nervures Alpamayo were in the line.

The line of intermediate gliders in the mid-2000s also included the Altea and Estive as well as the Valluna and the mountain descent Kenya. The Valluna became one of the first gliders by any manufacturer to be certified to the CEN standard.

Aircraft 

Summary of aircraft built by Nervures:
Nervures Aloha
Nervures Alpamayo
Nervures Altea
Nervures Arteson
Nervures Diamir
Nervures Estive
Nervures Etna
Nervures Erebus
Nervures Espade
Nervures Everglades
Nervures Faial
Nervures Huapi
Nervures Kailash
Nervures Kenya
Nervures Lhotse
Nervures LOL
Nervures Morea
Nervures Spantik
Nervures Stromboli
Nervures Swoop
Nervures Toubkal
Nervures Valluna
Nervures Whizz

References

External links

Aircraft manufacturers of France
Ultralight aircraft
Paramotors
Paragliders
Companies based in Occitania (administrative region)